Waterfall Cities is the eighth studio album by the English band Ozric Tentacles. It was released in 1999 on Stretchy Records.

Like previous studio albums by the band, Waterfall Cities was recorded at guitarist Edward Wynne's home studio, The Mill, and features a cover by the artist Blim.

Track listing
 "Coily" (Ozric Tentacles) – 7:19
 "Xingu" (Wynne, Seaweed, Geelani) – 7:27
 "Waterfall City" (Wynne) – 11:03
 "Ch'ai?" (Wynne, Seaweed, Geelani) – 5:03
 "Spiralmind" (Wynne, Ozric Tentacles, Geelani) – 11:41
 "Sultana Detrii" (Ozric Tentacles) – 9:18
 "Aura Borealis" (Wynne) – 5:40

Band personnel
 Ed Wynne – guitar, synthesizers
 Seaweed (Christopher Lenox-Smith) – synthesizers
 John Egan – flute
 Zia Geelani – bass guitar
 Rad (Conrad Prince) – drums

References

1999 albums
Ozric Tentacles albums